Culture and Society is a book published in 1958 by Welsh progressive writer Raymond Williams, exploring how the notion of culture developed in Great Britain, from the eighteenth through the twentieth centuries.

When first published, the book was regarded as having overturned conventional social and historical thinking about culture.  It argues that the notion of culture developed in response to the Industrial Revolution and the social and political changes it brought in its wake. This is done through a series of studies of famous British writers and essayists, beginning with Edmund Burke and William Cobbett, also looking at William Blake, William Wordsworth, etc., and continuing as far as F. R. Leavis, George Orwell and  Christopher Caudwell.

The book is still in print, in several editions.  It has also been translated into many languages.

Further reading

By Williams
Keywords: A Vocabulary of Culture and Society (Croom Helm, 1976). Originally intended as an appendix to Culture and Society.

About Williams
  E-book.

See also
 Information culture

1958 non-fiction books
Chatto & Windus books